Arlene Phyllis Klasky (born May 26, 1949) is an American animator, graphic designer, producer and co-founder of Klasky Csupo with Gábor Csupó.  In 1999, she was named one of the "Top 25 Women in Animation" by Animation Magazine. She is most known for her work with Nickelodeon in the 1990s and 2000s. She, along with her ex-husband Gábor Csupó and Paul Germain, co-created the animated series Rugrats as well as the 2021 revival series of the same name.

Career

Klasky Csupo

Klasky Csupo was formed with Gábor Csupó in the couple's two-bedroom Hollywood apartment in 1980. The company later was moved to Seward Street in Hollywood. They designed the logos for 21 Jump Street, Anything but Love and In Living Color; produced music videos for Beastie Boys and Luther Vandross; Simpsons shorts for The Tracey Ullman Show; shorts for Sesame Street; and the opening titles for In Living Color.

In 1989, after the birth of Klasky and Csupo's two sons, Klasky Csupo was asked by Nickelodeon for ideas, but Klasky felt she didn't have any since she mainly watched her sons go to the bathroom. Rugrats was inspired by the boys and what they would say if they could talk. The series started in August 1991 with the unaired pilot "Tommy Pickles and the Great White Thing". Rugrats went on to become one of Nickelodeon's most iconic and successful television series, winning three Emmy Awards. Klasky was the creative force behind the box-office hits The Rugrats Movie and Rugrats in Paris: The Movie.

Aaahh!!! Real Monsters premiered on Halloween in 1994, their second cartoon show to be aired on Nickelodeon. In 2003 she made the spin-off All Grown Up!; in the United States, it aired on Nickelodeon from 2003 to 2008, and has since aired reruns on TeenNick and Nicktoons.

Personal life
She was married to her business partner Gábor Csupó before they started their animation company; they have two sons together from their marriage. Tommy Pickles' appearance from Rugrats is based on her younger son, Brandon. Her older son's name was Jarrett. She is of Polish-Jewish and Russian-Jewish descent.

References

External links

 (Hector Navarro, moderator). Published June 3, 2016; listened June 4, 2016.

1949 births
Animators from Nebraska
Artists from Omaha, Nebraska
Living people
Showrunners
American graphic designers
Women graphic designers
20th-century American Jews
American television producers
American animated film producers
American women television producers
California Institute of the Arts alumni
Jewish American artists
Jewish women artists
American women animators
Nickelodeon Animation Studio people
American people of Polish-Jewish descent
American people of Russian-Jewish descent
21st-century American Jews
20th-century American women
21st-century American women
Aardman Animations people